Clarkson Office Building is a historic office building located at Potsdam in St. Lawrence County, New York.  It was built in 1901 and is a two-story, three by three bay, square shaped stone structure in the Romanesque style.  It is constructed of red Potsdam Sandstone and features a castellated roofline.

It was listed on the National Register of Historic Places in 2003.

References

Office buildings on the National Register of Historic Places in New York (state)
Romanesque Revival architecture in New York (state)
Office buildings completed in 1901
Buildings and structures in St. Lawrence County, New York
Sandstone buildings in the United States
National Register of Historic Places in St. Lawrence County, New York